The rock band Mott the Hoople have released seven studio albums, nine live albums, thirteen compilation albums and 15 singles. The discographies of Mott and British Lions are also included because they are a continuation of Mott the Hoople (without founding members Mick Ralphs and Ian Hunter, but featuring members of the original line-up of Mott the Hoople).

Albums

Studio albums

As Mott the Hoople

As Mott

As British Lions

Live albums

Compilation albums

Singles

References

External links
 Mott Archives. A fan site which contains an extended discography of Mott the Hoople and related persons/bands
 

Discographies of British artists
Rock music group discographies